The Best of Deicide is a compilation album by American death metal band Deicide. It is a collection of 20 songs from Deicide's catalogue with Roadrunner Records, the label with whom the band had recently ended its career-long record deal. However, no songs from In Torment in Hell are included on this compilation.

Track listing

Personnel
Glen Benton – bass, vocals
Eric Hoffman – guitars
Brian Hoffman – guitars
Steve Asheim – drums

References

Deicide (band) compilation albums
2003 greatest hits albums
Roadrunner Records compilation albums